The Nationalist Party of Greater Vietnam (in ), often known simply as  or ĐVQDĐ, was a nationalist and anti-communist political party and militant organisation that was active in Vietnam in the 20th century. The party operated rather secretively and had ties with Nguyễn Văn Thiệu. The party continues to be active outside of Vietnam, with the goal of a multi-party democratic government for the country.


History
The party was founded by Trương Tử Anh, known as "Anh Cả Phương" ("Eldest Brother Phương") in 1939. Among the original members were several prominent figures in Vietnam's politics, such as Dr. Phan Huy Quát and Dr. Nguyễn Tôn Hoàn.

During the era of French colonialism, the Đại Việt engaged in military attacks in an effort to gain independence. Some Đại Việt members were trained in Chinese military academies in Yunnan run by the Kuomintang, before the Chinese Communist Revolution. The party was pro-Japanese during World War II, when the Japanese occupied Indochina. After the partition of Vietnam in 1954, the Đại Việt were banned in the communist North Vietnam. They continued to be active in South Vietnam as an opposition to President Ngô Đình Diệm, and were often implicated in coup plots against Diệm, led by Đại Việt officers in the Army of the Republic of Vietnam.

Elitism crippled the party, preventing it from forming a broad base of support among the public. According to Edwin M. Moise, the Đại Việt were compelled to rely extensively on foreign support, which jeopardized their nationalism's legitimacy. As a result, even high-ranking members of the organizations under their authority found it difficult to inspire real devotion. They couldn't rely on the allegiance of the peasants alone; they couldn't even rely on the fidelity of their own army leaders.

Notable members included:
 Bùi Diễm was Ambassador to the US from 1967 to 1975.
 Phan Huy Quát served in different capacities with several cabinets of the State of Vietnam and of the Republic of Vietnam.  His highest position was Prime Minister in 1965.
 Nguyễn Tôn Hoàn briefly served as first Deputy Prime Minister in 1964.
 Trần Trung Dung served in South Vietnam's government and parliament.
 Hà Thúc Ký was Minister of Internal Affairs in 1964; in 1965, after a rift with other Đại Việt's leaders, he formed his own party, the Đại Việt Cách Mạng (Đại Việt Revolutionary Party).
 Nguyễn Ngọc Huy, the party's theorist and founder of the Tân Đại Việt (New Đại Việt Party); taught at Yale University after the fall of Saigon.
 Dương Hiếu Nghĩa, who participated in the 1963 coup d'état, was one of the officers who deposed and assassinated President Ngô Đình Diệm and National Adviser Ngô Đình Nhu on 2 November 1963.

See also
Vietnamese nationalism
Việt Quốc (VNQDĐ), a similarly-named nationalist party that uses the same flag

References

Bibliography 
 
 
 Guillemot (2019). "«Y a-t-il eu une troisième force au Viêt-Nam, 1947–1948?», Réponse à M. Nghiêm Phong Tuấn".

External links
Nationalist Party of Greater Vietnam

1939 establishments in Vietnam
Anti-communism in Vietnam
Anti-communist parties
Banned political parties in Vietnam
Defunct political parties in Vietnam
National liberation movements
Nationalist parties in Vietnam
Political parties established in 1939
Vietnamese independence movement